Marco Venier was a Marquess of Cerigo.

He was Venetian and won his Marquisate as a result of the Fourth Crusade.

Marriage and issue
He married ... and had Bartolommeo Venier, fl. between 1252 and 1275, who married ... and had Marco Venier, Lord of Cerigo.

References

External links
 Ancestry of Sultana Nur-Banu (Cecilia Venier-Baffo)

13th-century Venetian people
Marco
Year of birth unknown
Year of death unknown
Republic of Venice nobility